Bill Heatley (13 March 1886 – 31 August 1948) was an Australian rules footballer who played with Collingwood in the Victorian Football League (VFL).

Family
Heatley was born William Kennedy, the son of the then unmarried Catherine Kennedy (1867–1899); and, when she married William Peter Heatley (1862–1936), in 1890, he took his step-father's surname of Heatley.

He married Eva Russell (1892-1967) in 1912.

Football

Collingwood (VFL)
On 1 May 1908, he was granted a clearance from the Commonwealth Football Club, in Zeehan, Western Tasmania, to Collingwood. He played 50 games for Collingwood over four seasons.

Although he played in 16 matches, including the last three home-and-away matches, during the 1910 season, he did not play in any of the season's three Final matches.

Brighton (VFA)
Having played his final two senior matches for Collingwood (on 6 and 20 May 1912), he transferred to Brighton in the Victorian Football Association in late June 1912, but only played five games for them before his senior football career ended.

Death
He died (suddenly) on 31 August 1948.

Notes

References
 
 World War Two Nominal Roll: Private William Heatley (VX80347), Department of Veterans' Affairs.

External links 

 
 
 Bill Heatley's profile at Collingwood Forever
 Bill Heatley's playing statistics from the VFA Project

1886 births
1948 deaths
Australian rules footballers from Tasmania
Collingwood Football Club players
Brighton Football Club players